Tipulamima auronitens is a moth of the family Sesiidae. It is known from the Republic of the Congo.

References

Endemic fauna of the Republic of the Congo
Sesiidae
Fauna of the Republic of the Congo
Moths of Africa
Moths described in 1913